Galium trifidum is a species of flowering plant in the coffee family, known by the common name three-petal bedstraw. It grows widespread in the arctic, temperate and subtropical regions of the Northern Hemisphere: northern and central Asia (Siberia, the Russian Far East, China, Korea, Japan, Kazakhstan), northern and eastern Europe (Scandinavia, France, Austria, Poland, Russia, Ukraine, Baltic states) and much of North America (from Greenland and the Aleutians as far south as Oaxaca and Hispaniola).

Galium trifidum is a usually perennial herb forming tangles of thin stems up to half a meter long, ringed with whorls of several linear to oval leaves. The inflorescence is a cluster of small white or pinkish flowers, each with usually three petal-like lobes in its corolla.

Subspecies
Five subspecies are currently recognized (May 2014):

Galium trifidum subsp. brevipes (Fernald & Wiegand) Á.Löve & D.Löve - Canada and the northern United States (Dakotas to Maine)
Galium trifidum subsp. columbianum (Rydb.) Hultén - Russian Far East (Kamchatka, Khabarovsk, Primorye, Sakhalin), Japan, Korea, China, Taiwan, Alaska, British Columbia, Washington state, Oregon, California, Nevada, Idaho, Montana
Galium trifidum subsp. halophilum (Fernald & Wiegand) Puff - Quebec, Newfoundland, Canadian Maritimes, Maine, Massachusetts
Galium trifidum subsp. subbiflorum (Wiegand) Puff - Alaska, Yukon, Northwest Territories, Alberta, British Columbia, high elevations in the western United States as far south as California and New Mexico
Galium trifidum subsp. trifidum - widespread throughout most of species range

References

External links
 
Jepson Manual Treatment, Galium trifidum
USDA Plants Profile, Galium trifidum
Go Botany, New England Wildflower Society, Galium trifidum
Wildflowers of the Pacific Northwest, Turner Photographics (Bellingham Washington State USA), Galium trifidum
Botanik im Bild  /  Flora von Österreich, Liechtenstein und Südtirol, Dreizählig-Labkraut, Rubiaceae  /  Galium trifidum

Flora of Alaska
Flora of Austria
Flora of Canada
Flora of China
Flora of Finland
Flora of France
Flora of Greenland
Flora of Haiti
Flora of Japan
Flora of Kazakhstan
Flora of Korea
Flora of Mexico
Flora of North America
Flora of Norway
Flora of Poland
Flora of Russia
Flora of Siberia
Flora of Sweden
Flora of the Dominican Republic
Flora of the United States
Flora of Ukraine
Flora of Yukon
trifidum
Plants described in 1753
Taxa named by Carl Linnaeus
Flora without expected TNC conservation status